Tulppio is a village in the municipality of Savukoski, Lapland, Finland. There is no permanent residence in Tulppio, but a very popular camping resort for people on fishing trips is located there.

External links
 Tulppion majat (in Finnish)
 Railway Museums in Finland, including photograph of Lombard Steam Log Hauler at Tulppio

Villages in Finland
Savukoski
Geography of Lapland (Finland)